is the 28th single by Japanese singer/songwriter Chisato Moritaka. Written by Moritaka and Hiromasa Ijichi, the single was released by One Up Music on February 19, 1996. The song was used as the opening theme of the TBS music series Count Down TV.

Music video 
The music video features Moritaka performing the song at a dance hall with her band "Chisato Moritaka Lonely Hearts Club Band", a nod to her love of The Beatles' music.

Chart performance 
"So Blue" peaked at No. 7 on Oricon's singles chart and sold 270,000 copies. It was also certified Gold by the RIAJ.

Other versions 
Moritaka re-recorded the song and uploaded the video on her YouTube channel on August 16, 2013. This version is also included in Moritaka's 2014 self-covers DVD album Love Vol. 5.

Track listing 
All lyrics are written by Chisato Moritaka; all music is arranged by Yuichi Takahashi.

Personnel 
 Chisato Moritaka – vocals, drums, piano
 Yasuaki Maejima – piano, Fender Rhodes, percussion
 Yuichi Takahashi – guitar, keyboard
 Yukio Seto – bass
 Masafumi Yokoyama – bass

Chart positions

Certification

References

External links 
 
 

1996 singles
1996 songs
Japanese-language songs
Chisato Moritaka songs
Songs with lyrics by Chisato Moritaka
Songs with music by Hiromasa Ijichi
One Up Music singles